Hiram (Phoenician "benevolent brother", Hebrew חִירָם "high-born", Standard Hebrew Ḥiram, Tiberian Hebrew Ḥîrām) is a biblical given name referring to Phoenician kings.

People
 Hiram I, king of Tyrus, 980–947 BC
 Hiram II, king of Tyrus (modern-day Tyre, Lebanon), 739–730 BC
 Hiram Abiff, An appellation applied to the "skillful man" whom Hiram the king of Tyre sent to make the furnishings of Solomon's temple. 966 BC
 Hiram Abas (1932–1990), official in the National Intelligence Organization of Turkey
 Hiram Abrams (1878–1926), American movie mogul and one of the first presidents of Paramount Pictures
 Hiram G. Andrews (1876–1968), speaker of the Pennsylvania House of Representatives
 Hiram I. Bearss (1875–1938), Marine Corps officer and recipient of the Medal of Honor
 Hiram Bell, several people with this name
 Hiram Bennet (1826–1914), Congressional delegate from the Territory of Colorado and Colorado Secretary of State
 Hiram Berdan (1824–1893), American engineer and Army officer, creator of the Berdan rifle
 Hiram Berry (disambiguation), several people with this name
 Hiram Bingham (disambiguation), several people with this name
 Hiram Bithorn (1916–1951), first Puerto Rican Major League Baseball player
 Hiram Blanchard (1820–1874), Canadian lawyer and politician, first premier of Nova Scotia
 Hiram Boateng (born 1996), English association football player
 Hiram Abiff Boaz (1866–1962), president of Polytechnic College from 1902 to 1911, and of Southern Methodist University from 1920 to 1922
 Hiram Bocachica (born 1976), Puerto Rican baseball player
 Hiram Bond (1838–1906), American lawyer and banker
 Hiram N. Breed (born 1809), American cordwainer and politician
 Hiram J. Brendlinger (1824–1894), American politician and mayor of Denver
 Hiram Bullock (1955–2008), American jazz musician
 Hiram Burgos (born 1987), Puerto Rican baseball player
 Hiram R. Burton (1841–1927), American physician and politician
 Hiram Calvin (1841–1932), Canadian businessman and politician
 Hiram Cancio (1920–2008), judge of the US District Court for the District of Puerto Rico
 Hiram Caton (born 1936), Australian professor of politics and history
 Hiram Chittenden (1858–1917), American historian
 Hiram Codd (1838–1887), English engineer and inventor
 Hiram Cody, Canadian clergyman and novelist
 Hiram Cronk (1800–1905), American soldier, last surviving veteran of the War of 1812 at the time of his death
 Hiram Corson (1828–1911), American professor of literature
 Hiram Cox (1760–1799), English diplomat, serving in Bangladesh and Burma
 Hiram Davison (1894–1874), Canadian Air Force officer
 Hiram Deats (1810–1887), American businessman
 Hiram Edmund Deats (1870–1963), American philatelist
 Hiram Denio (1799–1871), American lawyer and politician, Chief Judge of the New York Court of Appeals
 Hiram Diaz, (born 1985), American Euphonium soloist
 Hiram Drache (1924–2020), American writer on agriculture, and historian-in-residence at Concordia College, Minnesota
 Hiram Edson (1806–1882), American pioneer of the Seventh-day Adventist Church, known for introducing the sanctuary doctrine to the church
 Hiram Eugene (born 1980), American football player (safety)
 Hiram Evans (disambiguation), several people with this name
 Hiram Everest (1830–1913), American businessman and farmer
 Hiram Fairchild (1845–1925), American politician and legislator
 Hiram Leong Fong (born Yau Leong Fong; 1906–2004), first Asian-American to serve in the US Senate
 Hiram Ford (1884–1969), US federal judge
 H. Robert Fowler (born Hiram Robert Fowler; 1851–1926), US Representative from Illinois
 Hiram Fuller (also known as: Hesham Ali Salem; born 1981), Libyan basketball player
 Hiram Fuller (journalist) (1814–1880)
 Hiram Gardner (1800–1874), American lawyer and politician
 Hiram Gill (1866–1919), first US mayor to undergo a recall election
 Ulysses S. Grant (born Hiram Ulysses Grant; 1822–1885), 18th President of the United States
 Hiram Gray (1801–1890), American lawyer and politician
 Hiram Halle (1867–1944), American businessman
 Hiram Hiller, Jr. (1867–1921), American physician, medical missionary, explorer, and ethnographer
 Hiram Hulse (born 1868), second Bishop of the Diocese of Cuba in The Episcopal Church
 Hiram P. Hunt (1796–1865), American politician
 Hiram Hunter (1874–1966),  New Zealand politician and trade unionist
 Hiram Hutchinson [1808–1869, American industrialist
 Hiram Hyde (1817–1907), Canadian stagecoach operator and political figure in Nova Scotia
 Hiram Imus, father of Hiram Imus, jr.
 Hiram Imus, jr. (1804–1876), American politician
 Hiram Johnson (1866–1945), American progressive and later isolationist politician and governor
 Hiram Kahanawai (1835–1874), Hawaiian high chief and husband of Princess Poʻomaikelani
 Hiram Keller (born Hiram Keller Undercofler, jr.; 1944–1997), American stage and film actor
 Hiram Kennedy (1852–1913), American physician and politician
 Hiram Kimball#Sarah Granger Kimball (died 1863), American Mormon pioneer
 Hiram Knowles (1834–1911), US federal judge
 Hiram Leavitt (1824–1901), early American settler, innkeeper, and judge, namesake of features such as 'Leavitt Peak, Leavitt Meadow, Leavitt Creek and Leavitt Lake Hiram Lowry (1843–1924), Chinese educator and Methodist clergyman
 Hiram Mather (1796–1868), American lawyer and politician
 Hiram Maxim (1840–1916), English creator of the Maxim gun
 Hiram E. McCallum (1899–1989), mayor of Toronto from 1948 to 1951
 Hiram McCullough (1813–1885), US Congressman
 Hiram Z. Mendow (1894-2001), Al Capone's lawyer during his trial
 Hiram Messenger, several people with this name
 Hiram Mier (born 1989), Mexican association football player
 Hiram Frederick Moody, III, also known as Rick Moody, American author
 Hiram Monserrate (born 1967), expelled member of the New York State Senate
 Hiram N. Moulton (1818–1899), mayor of Madison, Wisconsin
 Hiram Norton (ca. 1799–1875), merchant and political figure in Upper Canada
 Hiram Page (1800–1852), American, early member of the Latter Day Saint movement 
 Hiram Paulding (1797–1878), American Navy officer
 Hiram Powers (1805–1873), American sculptor
 Hiram Pratt (1800–1840), mayor of Buffalo, New York
 Hiram Price (1814–1901), American businessman
 Hiram F. Reynolds (1854–1938), American minister and general superintendent in the Church of the Nazarene
 Hiram Revels (1827–1901), first African-American to serve in the US Senate
 Hiram Richmond (1810–1885), Pennsylvanian member of the US House of Representatives
 Hiram Torres Rigual (1922–2006), Puerto Rican Superior Court judge  
 Hiram Runnels (1796–1857), American politician
 Hiram Scofield (1830–1906), American lawyer and Union Army officer
 Hiram Sherman (1908–1989), American actor
 Hiram Sibley (1807–1888), American industrialist and philanthropist
 Hiram Sinsabaugh (c. 1832–1892), American banker and Methodist Episcopal minister
 Hiram Stevens (disambiguation), several people with this name
 Hiland Stickney (born Hiram Stickney; 1867–1911), American football player (tackle) and football coach
 Hiram Straight (1814–1897), American farmer and politician
 Hiram Tua (born 1983), ring name of Puerto Rican wrestler Hiram Mulero Hiram Tuttle (disambiguation), several people with this name
 Hiram A. Unruh (1845–1916), American soldier and politician
 Hiram Walbridge (1821–1870), American politician
 Hiram Walden (1800–1880), American politician
 Hiram Walker (1816–1899), American grocer and distiller, and the eponym of the famous distillery in Windsor, Ontario, Canada
 Hiram Ward (1923–2002), US federal judge
 Hiram Widener, jr. (1923–2007), US federal judge
 Hiram Wilkinson (disambiguation), several people with this name
 Hank Williams (born Hiram King Williams; 1923–1953), American country music singer
 Hiram D. Williams (1917–2003), American painter and professor of art
 Hiram Wilson (1803–1864), American anti-slavery abolitionist
 Hiram V. Willson (1808–1866), US federal judge
 Hiram A. Wright (1823–1855), American educator and politician
 Hiram Young (c. 1812–1882), African-American wagon manufacturer and entrepreneur

Fictional people
 Hiram Abiff, a character in Masonic lore
 Hiram Burrows, a character from the game Dishonored Lieutenant Hiram Coffey, a character in the movie The Abyss Hiram Flagston, a character in the comic Hi and Lois by Greg and Brian Walker
 Hiram Grewgious, a character in the novel The Mystery of Edwin Drood by Charles Dickens
 Hiram Gummer, the anti-hero of Tremors 4: The Legend Begins Hiram "Brains" Hackenbacker, aka Brains in Thunderbirds Hiram Hillburn, the fictional friend of Emmett Till in the young adult novel Mississippi Trial, 1955 Hiram Holliday, A character created by Paul Gallico in an eponymous novel and television series
 Hiram Lodge, a fictional character in Archie Comics
 Hiram McDaniels, a character in Welcome to Night Vale Hiram Patterson, a media mogul in the science fiction novel The Light of Other Days by Arthur C. Clarke and Stephen Baxter
 Sebastian Hiram Shaw, a supervillain by Marvel Comics
 Hiram Walker, superhuman protagonist in the novel The Water Dancer by Ta-Nehisi Coates
 Hiram Wolfe the adoptive grandfather wolf of Heffer Wolfe from Rocko's Modern Life Hiram Worchester, a character from the book series Wild Cards''

See also
 Hiram (disambiguation) for other uses of Hiram'''

Similar spelling
 Hyrum Smith, several people with this name
 

Jewish given names
Jewish masculine given names